Mark Evans is a Welsh comedy writer, director and actor.

Early life 
Evans was raised in Wrexham and read Classics at Cambridge University. He joined the Footlights, where he became president, and met writing partner James Bachman and also Robert Webb. After an unsuccessful stint as a stand-up comedian, he decided to switch to screenwriting.

Career

Television
Evans' big break came when he was asked to write for Jack Docherty's eponymous show The Jack Docherty Show. His most notable work was for Mitchell and Webb's radio show That Mitchell and Webb Sound and its award-winning television adaptation That Mitchell and Webb Look. Some of his other credits include Ant & Dec's Saturday Night Takeaway (2002–2003), Popetown (2005) and The Late Edition (2006). He has also appeared in That Mitchell and Webb Look as various minor characters, Saxondale, the CBBC programme Sorry, I've Got No Head and various commercials.

Radio
He wrote the popular BBC Radio 4 comedy series Bleak Expectations, which ran from 2007 to 2012. It was adapted into a four episode TV series in late 2011, The Bleak Old Shop of Stuff.
 
On 6 May 2008, he and long-time writing partner James Bachman recorded the pilot of their BBC Radio 4 comedy Zoom, starring David Soul, Carla Mendonca, and Jon Glover, with a special guest appearance by Nicholas Parsons as himself.

Books
In November 2012, Constable & Robinson published Evans' novel based on Bleak Expectations.

References

External links
 

Welsh male television actors
Alumni of the University of Cambridge
Living people
1973 births
Welsh comedy writers
Welsh male radio actors